Shafqat Tanvir Mirza – known by many as STM (6 February 1932 – 20 November 2012) was a Pakistani writer and a journalist. He was also a journalist union leader and was sent to jail twice because of his activities on behalf of newspapers he worked for.

Early life and career
Born in the village of Domeli, in the Punjab province of Pakistan, he studied at schools in Chakwal, Khushab, Wazirabad, Attock, Bahawalnagar and at Gordon College, Rawalpindi. Mirza's earlier career centred on Rawalpindi, where he worked for the daily newspapers Tameer and Hilal, as well as at Radio Pakistan. In 1970, he joined Daily Musawat, subsequently moving on to Daily Imroze, where he became the editor. In the 1990s, Shafqat Tanvir Mirza joined the English language newspaper Dawn, where he contributed regular columns on Punjabi language and culture.

Activities as an author and translator
Shafqat Tanvir Mirza was also active as an author, writing and translating a number of books. He wrote in Urdu, Punjabi and English.
 Tehreek-i-Azadi Vich Punjab da Hissa (Punjabi)
 Adab Raheen Punjab de Tareekh (Punjabi)
 Resistance Themes in Punjabi Literature (English)
 Making of a Nation (English)
 Shah Hussain, a biography of 16th century Sufi poet (in Urdu language)
 Lahu suhag, a Punjabi translation of Blood Wedding by Garcia Lorca
 Booha Koeena, a Punjabi translation of No Exit by Jean-Paul Sartre
 Akhia Sachal Sarmast nay, a translation of the Seraiki prose of Sachal Sarmast

Awards and recognition
Pride of Performance Award by the President of Pakistan in 2005

References

 

Pakistani non-fiction writers
2012 deaths
1932 births
Pakistani literary critics
Punjabi-language writers
Punjabi people
Punjabi academics
Pakistani male journalists
Pakistani newspaper editors
Pakistani columnists
Government Gordon College alumni